Thomas George Greenwood (6 September 1889 – 8 January 1935) was an Australian rules footballer who played with Essendon in the Victorian Football League (VFL).

Notes

External links 

1889 births
1935 deaths
Australian rules footballers from Victoria (Australia)
Essendon Football Club players